John Douglas may refer to:

Politics and war 
John Douglas, Lord of Balvenie (c. 1433–1463), Scottish soldier
John Douglas, 2nd Earl of Morton (died 1513), Scottish nobleman
John Douglas Sr. (1636–?), politician in Maryland
John Douglas of Broughton (c. 1698–1732), Member of Parliament for Peebleshire 1722–32
Sir John Douglas, 3rd Baronet, of Kelhead (c. 1708–1778), Member of Parliament for Dumfriesshire, 1741–47
John Erskine Douglas (c. 1758–1847), Royal Navy admiral
John Douglas (Royal Marines officer) (died 1814), British officer involved in a scandal regarding an allegedly illegitimate child born to the Princess of Wales, Caroline of Brunswick
John Douglas (died 1838) (1774–1838), Tory politician, Member of Parliament for Orford 1818–21 and for Minehead 1822–26
John Douglas, 7th Marquess of Queensberry (1779–1856), Scottish Whig politician
John Douglas (British Army officer) (1817–1888), British general
John Douglas (Connecticut politician), member of the General Court of the Colony of Connecticut in 1669–70
John Douglas (Queensland politician) (1828–1904), Premier of Queensland
John Douglas (colonial administrator) (1835–1885), Irish governor of Ceylon
John Douglas, 9th Marquess of Queensberry (1844–1900), Scottish nobleman
John Carey Douglas (1874–1926), politician in Nova Scotia, Canada
John Henry Douglas (1851–1930), politician in Ontario, Canada
John Taylor Douglas (1892–1976), politician in Saskatchewan, Canada
John Douglas (Irish politician) (1912–1982), senator 1954–57
John Douglas, 21st Earl of Morton (1927–2016), Scottish peer and landowner
John St Leger Douglas, British member of parliament for Weobley

Religion 
John Douglas (archbishop of St Andrews) (1494–1574), Scottish archbishop and Chancellor of the University of St. Andrews
John Douglas (bishop of Salisbury) (1721–1807), Scottish bishop and literary critic
John Waldo Douglas (1818–1883), American minister
John Albert Douglas (1868–1956), Church of England priest

Sport 
Johnny Douglas (1882–1930), English cricket captain and 1908 Olympic middleweight boxing champion
John Douglas (baseball) (1917–1984), American baseball player
John Douglas (boxer) (born 1971), Guyanese boxer
John Douglas (rugby union) (born 1934), Scottish international rugby player
John Douglas (fencer) (born 1943), Australian Olympic fencer
John Douglas (defensive back) (1945–2005), American football player
John Douglas (linebacker) (born 1945), American football player
John Douglas (sportsman) (born 1951), Australian rules footballer and cricketer
John Douglas (basketball) (born 1956), American basketball player
John Douglas (footballer) (born 1961), English footballer
Jon Douglas (1936–2010), American tennis and American football player

Other 
John Douglas (lithotomist) (died 1743), Scottish surgeon
John Douglas (Scottish architect) (c. 1709–1778)
John William Douglas (1814–1905), English entomologist
John Douglas (English architect) (1830–1911), British architect
Johnny Douglas (conductor) (1920–2003), English composer, musical director and string arranger
John W. Douglas (1921–2010), American attorney and civil rights advocate
John E. Douglas (born 1945), FBI criminal profiler
John Douglas (conductor) (1956–2010), American conductor
John Primrose Douglas, honorary surgeon to the Queen

See also
Jack Douglas (disambiguation)
John Douglass (disambiguation)
Jonathan Douglas (disambiguation)